De Grote Sprong (The Great Leap) is a Flemish reality television series broadcast on VTM. The program is based on the Celebrity Splash! format created by Dutch company Eyeworks. In each episode, six celebrities perform dives after being trained by professionals Hassan Mouti, Tanya Ilieva, and Steve Black. The dives are judged by a panel consisting of Frans van de Konijnenburg, Anna Bader, and Frédérik Deburghgraeve. The program is hosted by Evi Hanssen and Kürt Rogiers.

The Season 1 winner was Tanja Dexters.

Season 1 (2013) 

Belgian reality television series
2010s Belgian game shows
2013 Belgian television series debuts
Flemish television shows
2010s Belgian television series
VTM (TV channel) original programming